Bazigar (from  bazi + gar), or Goaars, are an ethnic group of north-western India. They are primarily found in Punjab and in Pakistan's Punjab, but there are also communities in Haryana, Uttar Pradesh, Delhi, Chandigarh, Himachal Pradesh, Jammu and Kashmir, and Rajasthan. They were previously nomadic with their main occupation the performance of acrobatics and other forms of entertainment, but they  are now settled and engaged mainly in agricultural and similar forms of labour.

Origin 
The name Bazigar is derived from the Urdu word bazi, which means an acrobat. They themselves claim to be Chauhan Rajputs, who took to the occupation of acrobatics. They have now been granted Scheduled Caste status in Haryana, Punjab and Uttar Pradesh. The Bazigar speak their own dialect, known as Bazigar, while speaking in Hindi with outsiders. In Haryana, they are found mainly in the districts of Yamuna Nagar, Ambala, Kurukshetra, Rohtak, Sirsa, Fatehabad, Karnal. Major Bazigar clans in Haryan include the Lalka, Myane, Dharsout, Namsout, and Jagateka.

In Punjab, the Bazigar have Scheduled Caste status. They are found throughout Punjab, but in terms of numbers, they are concentrated in Patiala, Sangrur, and Bathinda districts are centres of this tribe. The Bazigar are a nomadic tribe, who go about from village to village practising acrobatic feats. Their primary occupation was the performance of acrobatics. Generally, each family was allocated twelve villages, and the Bazigar were paid by the villagers to entertain them. Many Bazigar were also employed as seasonal agricultural laborers. With the increase in televisions in rural Punjab, the Bazigar's traditional occupation is under threat.

The Bazigar are further sub-divided into five sub-groups, the Jogi, Badtia (Wartia), Muchhal (muchhals), Jassuke, Dharamsot and Namsout. The first four sub-divisions cannot intermarry, but Namsout only marry within the clan. Historically, the Bazigar were either Hindu or Muslim, but with the departure of their Muslim patrons due to the partition, the Bazigar have embraced Sikhism. They have also abandoned their traditional dialect Bazigar boli for standard Punjabi.

References

Bibliography 

Ethnic groups in India
Modern nomads
Sikh communities
Punjabi tribes
Social groups of Punjab, India
Social groups of Haryana
Scheduled Castes of Haryana